Virginian Railway Underpass is a historic concrete arch bridge located at New Ellett, Montgomery County, Virginia. It was built in 1906, and is a single circular barrel underpass constructed of cast-in-place concrete.

The bridge was listed on the National Register of Historic Places in 1989.

See also
List of bridges on the National Register of Historic Places in Virginia

References

Railroad bridges in Virginia
Railroad bridges on the National Register of Historic Places in Virginia
Bridges completed in 1906
Buildings and structures in Montgomery County, Virginia
National Register of Historic Places in Montgomery County, Virginia
Concrete bridges in the United States
Arch bridges in the United States
1906 establishments in Virginia